Mona-Jeanette Berntsen (known as only Mona Berntsen) is a Norwegian-Moroccan dancer on the Purpose World Tour with Justin Bieber. Mona is known for winning So You Think You Can Dance Scandinavia, and for working with artists such as Justin Timberlake, Alicia Keys and Chris Brown.

Bio 
Mona Berntsen was born and raised in Norway by a Moroccan mother and a father from Northern Norway. After having her dance career breakthrough as the winner of So You Think You Can Dance Scandinavia at the age of 18, Mona was signed by Bloc Agency and moved from Norway to Los Angeles. In the coming years Mona worked with some of the world's biggest artists, including Justin Timberlake and Alicia Keys, before traveling on two world tours with Chris Brown. Mona has since performed at some of the world's biggest stages and shows, including the Academy Awards, Grammy Awards, Billboard Awards and several MTV Award Shows. In 2015, Mona also performed for Nike during a clothing line launch.

Mona grew up as a member of street dance crew Cre-8, with fellow So You Think You Can Dance Scandinavia contestant Daniel Sarr and So You Think You Can Dance Norway contestant Alexandra Joner as some of the other members. With Maria Karlsen as lead choreographer, Cre-8 got to the semi finals in Norway's Got Talent.

So You Think You Can Dance Norway

So You Think You Can Dance Scandinavia

References

People from Bærum
Norwegian female dancers
Dansefeber contestants
Living people
So You Think You Can Dance winners
Norwegian people of Moroccan descent
Hip hop dancers
1990 births